is a railway station in the city of Tōno, Iwate, Japan, operated by East Japan Railway Company (JR East).

Lines
Tōno Station is served by the Kamaishi Line, and is located 46.0 kilometers from the terminus of the line at Hanamaki Station.

Station layout
The station has a single side platform and an island platform, connected to the station building by a footbridge. The station has a Midori no Madoguchi staffed ticket office.

Platforms

History

The line was nationalized in August 1936, becoming the Kamaishi Line. The station was absorbed into the JR East network upon the privatization of the Japanese National Railways (JNR) on 1 April 1987.

Passenger statistics
In fiscal 2018, the station was used by an average of 330 passengers daily (boarding passengers only).

Surrounding area
 Tōno Post Office
 Tōno City Hall
 Tōno Zoo
 Nabukura Park
 Tōno Folklore Village

See also
 List of railway stations in Japan

References

External links

  

Railway stations in Iwate Prefecture
Kamaishi Line
Railway stations in Japan opened in 1914
Tōno, Iwate
Stations of East Japan Railway Company